Stuart Richard Doncaster (September 1890 – 1955) was an English professional footballer who played as a centre forward in the Football League for Glossop and Aston Villa.

Personal life 
Doncaster enlisted in the Coldstream Guards in September 1908 and was still a private in the regiment when the First World War broke out in 1914. He was posted to the Western Front in August 1914 and due to a gunshot wound to the hand, he was discharged as "being no longer physically fit for war service" in July 1915.

Career statistics

References

1890 births
1955 deaths
English footballers
English Football League players
British Army personnel of World War I
Glossop North End A.F.C. players
Association football forwards
Footballers from Nottinghamshire
Buxton F.C. players
Stourbridge F.C. players
Aston Villa F.C. players
Matlock Town F.C. players
Coldstream Guards soldiers
British shooting survivors